Convenience is the fourth studio album by Die Warzau, released on October 10, 2004 by Pulseblack.

Reception

Stewart Mason of AllMusic criticized Convenience as being misdirected and lackluster, saying it "sounds in large part like a tentative attempt to introduce Die Warzau's sample-happy dance-industrial aesthetic into a world where industrial is entirely yesterday's news." Hybrid Magazine praised the clean production quality but criticized the music for being too accessible. Similarly Mike Schiller of PopMatters praised the Die Warzau for embracing a more pop-oriented direction but disproved of their excessive stylistic divergences. Tony Fletcher of Trouser Press commended the album and said "surprising, original and appealing, Convenience breaks the mold and begins a new phase for a band that is clearly unburdened by stylistic stereotypes."

Kim Owens of Kaffeine Buzz commended the band for reinventing itself, saying "Although it may alienate the true fans of the group's hardcore material of the past, I see it as a brave, creative, and welcomed move instead of taking the predictable path." Steve Mangione of mxdwn Music noted Jim Marcus's vocals and Van Christie's production as being the strong points of the album and said "layers of samples, crunchy noise, tight beats and sinister basslines propel the songs forward in a delectably dismal blend of electronica and darkwave."

Track listing

Personnel
Adapted from the Convenience liner notes.

Die Warzau
 Van Christie – instruments, production, recording, mixing
 Dan Evans – instruments, production, recording, mixing
 Abel Garibaldi – instruments, production, recording, mixing
 Jim Marcus – lead vocals, production, instruments

Additional performers
 Biff Blumfengagne – instruments
 Sanyung Cho – instruments
 Ted Cho – instruments
 Chris Connelly – instruments
 Rick Dody – instruments
 Andre Filardo – instruments
 Chris Greene – instruments
 Janina Hanna – instruments
 Marcel Henderson – instruments
 Matt Marcoto – instruments
 Zoë McKenzie – instruments
 Jason McNinch – instruments
 Chris Morford – instruments
 J.C. Stokes – instruments
 Louis Svitek – instruments
 DJ. Redlocks – instruments
 Mary Dee Reynolds – instruments
 Vinnie Signorelli – instruments
 Kevin Temple – instruments
 Mars Williams – instruments
 Matt Warren – instruments
 James Woolley – instruments

Production and design
 Tom Coyne – mastering

Release history

References

External links 
 Convenience at Bandcamp
 

2004 albums
Die Warzau albums